The International José Martí Prize serves to "promote and reward an activity of outstanding merit in accordance with the ideals and spirit" of Cuban independence leader, thinker, and poet José Martí". 

The Prize is awarded by the United Nations Educational, Scientific and Cultural Organization (UNESCO) roughly every four years. It was first given in 1995, the centenary of Martí's death. In addition to the intrinsic distinction bestowed on recipients, the award comes with a sum of money (currently USD $5,000), and donated by the government of Cuba.

Prize winners are selected by the unanimous decision a jury of seven – five "eminent persons" appointed by the director-general of UNESCO, another eminent figure chosen by the Cuban authorities, and a representative of the director-general – from a list of candidates submitted by UNESCO member states and accredited non-governmental organizations. Individuals, groups of people,  and institutions are all eligible as candidates.

Laureates

See also
Order of José Marti

Link
 Official site

UNESCO awards